Tarandacuao is a Mexican city (and municipality) located in the lowlands of the state of Guanajuato. The municipality has an area of 117.39 square kilometres, (0.31% of the surface of the state) and is bordered to the north and east by Jerécuaro, to the south by the state of Michoacán, and to the west by Acámbaro. The municipality had 11,583 inhabitants according to the 2005 census. Outlying communities found in Tarandacuao include La Purísima, San Juan De Dios, San José de Hidalgo, San Antonio, El Tocuz, San felipe and La Virgen.

The name of the municipality is of Purépecha origin and means "Place where the water is born," a possible reference to the Lerma River, which runs through the region.

.

Official website
Tarandacuau, GTO

References

Populated places in Guanajuato
Municipalities of Guanajuato